Club Getafe Deportivo was a Spanish football club based in Getafe, a city in the Madrid metropolitan area, Spain.  Founded in 1923 and refounded in 1946, it played six seasons in Segunda División, dissolving in 1983 and being replaced by Getafe CF.

Club names
Sociedad Getafe Deportivo (1923- 1924)
Club Getafe Deportivo Foot-ball Club (1924-1932)
Club Getafe Deportivo (1946- 1967)
Club Getafe Kelvinator (1967- 1970)
Club Getafe Deportivo (1970- 1983)

Stadiums
Campo del Aeródromo (1923- 1927)
Campo de la Dehesa de la Chica (1927- 1930)
Campo de la Calle del Vinagre (1930- 1932)
Campo del Regimiento de Artillería (1946- 1950)
Campo de los Sindicatos (1950- 1956)
Campo Municipal de San Isidro (1956- 1970)
Estadio Municipal Las Margaritas (1970- 1983)

Season to season

6 seasons in Segunda División
18 seasons in Tercera División

References

External links
Getafe CF official website 

 
Association football clubs established in 1923
Association football clubs established in 1946
Association football clubs disestablished in 1983
Defunct football clubs in the Community of Madrid
1946 establishments in Spain
1983 disestablishments in Spain
Segunda División clubs